The Beaufort scale  is an empirical measure that relates wind speed to observed conditions at sea or on land. Its full name is the Beaufort wind force scale.

History 

The scale that carries Beaufort's name had a long and complex evolution from the previous work of others (including Daniel Defoe the century before) to when Beaufort was Hydrographer of the Navy in the 1830s, when it was adopted officially and first used during the voyage of HMS Beagle under Captain Robert FitzRoy, who was later to set up the first Meteorological Office (Met Office) in Britain giving regular weather forecasts. In the 18th century, naval officers made regular weather observations, but there was no standard scale and so they could be very subjective – one man's "stiff breeze" might be another's "soft breeze". Beaufort succeeded in standardising the scale.

The initial scale of 13 classes (zero to 12) did not reference wind speed numbers but related qualitative wind conditions to effects on the sails of a frigate, then the main ship of the Royal Navy, from "just sufficient to give steerage" to "that which no canvas sails could withstand".

The scale was made a standard for ship's log entries on Royal Navy vessels in the late 1830s and was adapted to non-naval use from the 1850s, with scale numbers corresponding to cup anemometer rotations.  In 1853, the Beaufort scale was accepted as generally applicable at the First International Meteorological Conference in Brussels.

In 1916, to accommodate the growth of steam power, the descriptions were changed to how the sea, not the sails, behaved and extended to land observations. Rotations to scale numbers were standardised only in 1923. George Simpson, CBE (later Sir George Simpson), director of the UK Meteorological Office, was responsible for this and for the addition of the land-based descriptors. The measures were slightly altered some decades later to improve its utility for meteorologists. Nowadays, meteorologists typically express wind speed in kilometres or miles per hour or, for maritime and aviation purposes, knots; but Beaufort scale terminology is still sometimes used in weather forecasts for shipping and the severe weather warnings given to the public.

Extended scale
The Beaufort scale was extended in 1946 when forces 13 to 17 were added. However, forces 13 to 17 were intended to apply only to special cases, such as tropical cyclones. Nowadays, the extended scale is only used in Taiwan and mainland China, which are often affected by typhoons. Internationally, WMO Manual on Marine Meteorological Services (2012 edition) defined the Beaufort Scale only up to force 12 and there was no recommendation on the use of the extended scale.

Wind speed on the 1946 Beaufort scale is based on the empirical relationship:

 v = 0.836 B3/2 m/s
 v = 1.625 B3/2 knots

where v is the equivalent wind speed at 10 metres above the sea surface and B is Beaufort scale number. For example, B = 9.5 is related to 24.5 m/s which is equal to the lower limit of "10 Beaufort". Using this formula the highest winds in hurricanes would be 23 in the scale. F1 tornadoes on the Fujita scale and T2 TORRO scale also begin roughly at the end of level 12 of the Beaufort scale, but are independent scales – although the TORRO scale wind values are based on the 3/2 power law relating wind velocity to Beaufort force.

Wave heights in the scale are for conditions in the open ocean, not along the shore.

Modern scale 

The Beaufort scale is not an exact nor an objective scale; it was based on visual and subjective observation of a ship and of the sea. The corresponding integral wind speeds were determined later, but the values in different units were never made equivalent.

The scale is used in the Shipping Forecasts broadcast on BBC Radio 4 in the United Kingdom, and in the Sea Area Forecast from Met Éireann, the Irish Meteorological Service. Met Éireann issues a "Small Craft Warning" if winds of Beaufort force 6 (mean wind speed exceeding 22 knots) are expected up to 10 nautical miles offshore. Other warnings are issued by Met Éireann for Irish coastal waters, which are regarded as extending 30 miles out from the coastline, and the Irish Sea or part thereof: "Gale Warnings" are issued if winds of Beaufort force 8 are expected; "Strong Gale Warnings" are issued if winds of Beaufort force 9 or frequent gusts of at least 52 knots are expected.; "Storm Force Warnings" are issued if Beaufort force 10 or frequent gusts of at least 61 knots are expected; "Violent Storm Force Warnings" are issued if Beaufort force 11 or frequent gusts of at least 69 knots are expected; "Hurricane Force Warnings" are issued if winds of greater than 64 knots are expected.

This scale is also widely used in the Netherlands, Germany, Greece, China, Taiwan, Hong Kong, Malta, and Macau, although with some differences between them. Taiwan uses the Beaufort scale with the extension to 17 noted above. China also switched to this extended version without prior notice on the morning of 15 May 2006, and the extended scale was immediately put to use for Typhoon Chanchu. Hong Kong and Macau retain force 12 as the maximum.

In the United States of America, winds of force 6 or 7 result in the issuance of a small craft advisory, with force 8 or 9 winds bringing about a gale warning, force 10 or 11 a storm warning ("a tropical storm warning" being issued instead of the latter two if the winds relate to a tropical cyclone), and force 12 a hurricane-force wind warning (or hurricane warning if related to a tropical cyclone). A set of red warning flags (daylight) and red warning lights (night time) is displayed at shore establishments which coincide with the various levels of warning.

In Canada, maritime winds forecast to be in the range of 6 to 7 are designated as "strong"; 8 to 9 "gale force"; 10 to 11 "storm force"; 12 "hurricane force". Appropriate wind warnings are issued by Environment Canada's Meteorological Service of Canada: strong wind warning, gale (force wind) warning, storm (force wind) warning and hurricane-force wind warning. These designations were standardised nationally in 2008, whereas "light wind" can refer to 0 to 12 or 0 to 15 knots and "moderate wind" 12 to 19 or 16 to 19 knots, depending on regional custom, definition or practice. Prior to 2008, a "strong wind warning" would have been referred to as a "small craft warning" by Environment Canada, similar to US terminology. (Canada and the USA have the Great Lakes in common.)

Weather scale 

Beaufort's name was also attached to the Beaufort scale for weather reporting:

In this scale the weather could be reported as "s.c." for snow and detached cloud or "g.r.q." for dark, rain and squally.

See also 
 Bowditch's American Practical Navigator
 CLIWOC
 Enhanced Fujita scale
 Douglas sea scale
 Fujita scale
 Saffir–Simpson scale
 Sea state
 Squall
 TORRO scale
 Extratropical cyclone

References

External links 

 National Meteorological Library and Archive  fact sheet on the history of the Beaufort Scale, including various scales and photographic depictions of the sea state.
 Film of Wind Scale
 Historical Wind Speed Equivalents Of The Beaufort Scale
 Howtoons Poster showing effects on land/sea effects at each step.
 Beaufort scale, cites the original definition formula
 Ireland's Beaufort was Windscale Inventor—by Dr John de Courcy Ireland
 The Beaufort Scale and Weather Diaries of Rear Admiral Sir Francis Beaufort—The history of the Beaufort Scale
 Radio interview with Scott Huler
 Beaufort wind force scale. Met Office
 US Economic Costs of High Winds at NOAA Economics

Hazard scales
Wind
Marine meteorology
Scales in meteorology
Irish inventions